Daryll Sylvester Matthew is an Antiguan and Barbudan politician, representing St. John's Rural South in the Antigua and Barbuda House of Representatives

Early life and education 
Matthew has an MBA from Aston University in the UK with a focus on international business and a thesis on foreign direct investment, as well as a master's degree in geo-information management from Twente University in Enschede, the Netherlands.

Political career 
On January 9, 2018, Matthew was appointed to the Antigua and Barbuda Senate. In March 2018, he was elected as the Legislative Representative of the St. John's Rural South on the platform of the ABLP. On March 22, 2018, he was appointed Minister of Sports, Culture, National Festivals, and the Arts.

Administration, Project Management, Business Development, and Community Service were important aspects of Daryll Matthew's life both personally and professionally before he entered national politics in Antigua and Barbuda.

His areas of study match his profession as a person who is highly technical oriented but has a passion for business (Land Surveying at the University of Technology, Jamaica; Geographic Information Management, and Business Administration, specializing in International Business and Foreign Direct Investment).

Matthew has quickly advanced his career within Antigua and Barbuda's public service. He started working for the Antigua and Barbuda Surveys Division in 1998. By 2002, he had advanced to the position of Senior Environment Officer, and in 2004 he was named Chief Lands Officer. His native Antigua and Barbuda has been represented by him in numerous international platforms throughout his time in the public service. They include: Hong Kong, China, India, The People's Republic of China, The Philippines, Colombia, Mexico, Australia, Kenya, The United States, and Hong Kong.

Honours and awards 
In 2012, Matthew was awarded the National Youth Award for Entrepreneurship, from the Government of Antigua and Barbuda.

Personal life 
Over the years, Minister Matthew has been involved in his nation and neighborhood in a number of capacities, including volunteer work and sports development.

Matthew has held roles in:

 Chief Executive Officer of the Golden Eagles Sports Club 
 Jamaica's Antigua and Barbuda Students Association president 
 Member of the Kingston, Jamaica, Rotaract Club 
 member of the Antigua Rotaract Club 
 President of the Antigua Rotaract Cub 
 a member of the Antigua Rotary Club 
 Member of the Rotary Club of Antigua's Board of Directors 
 member of the Antigua Commercial Bank's board of directors 
 Executive Member of the National Olympic Committee and President of the Antigua and Barbuda Basketball Association 
 Founder and former Director of Myst Carnival Treasurer of the Caribbean Basketball Confederation Vice President of Finance and Marketing of the CBC Member of the CBA Finance Committee

References 

Living people
Members of the House of Representatives (Antigua and Barbuda)
Antigua and Barbuda Labour Party politicians
Year of birth missing (living people)
Alumni of Aston University